European Youth Olympic Festival (also European Youth Olympic Days) is a multi-sport event held in both summer and winter disciplines every second year. Speed skating is one of the sports in its winter edition. The competition is held in junior category.

Medalists

Junior ladies

Junior men

Cumulative medal count

References 

Speed skating at multi-sport events
European Youth Olympic Winter Festival
International speed skating competitions